Knuckle pads (also known as "Heloderma", meaning similar to the skin of the Gila monster lizard for which it is named) are circumscribed, keratotic, fibrous growths over the dorsa of the interphalangeal joints. They are described as well-defined, round, plaque-like, fibrous thickening that may develop at any age, and grow to be 10 to 15mm in diameter in the course of a few weeks or months, then go away over time.

Knuckle pads are sometimes associated with Dupuytren's contracture and camptodactyly, and histologically, the lesions are fibromas. Knuckle pads are generally non-responsive to treatment, including corticosteroids, and tend to recur after surgery; however, there has been some effectiveness with intralesional fluorouracil.

See also
 Skin lesion
 List of cutaneous conditions
 Garrod's pad

References

Further reading

External links 

Dermal and subcutaneous growths
Soft tissue disorders